SAGE Publishing, formerly SAGE Publications, is an American independent publishing company founded in 1965 in New York by Sara Miller McCune and now based in Newbury Park, California. 

It publishes more than 1,000 journals, more than 800 books a year, reference works and electronic products covering business, humanities, social sciences, science, technology and medicine. SAGE also owns and publishes under the imprints of Corwin Press (since 1990), CQ Press (since 2008), Learning Matters (since 2011), and Adam Matthew Digital (since 2012).

History 

SAGE was founded in 1965 in New York City by Sara Miller (later Sara Miller McCune) with Macmillan Publishers executive George D. McCune as a mentor; the name of the company is an acronym formed from the first letters of their given names. SAGE relocated to Southern California in 1966, after Miller and McCune married; McCune left Macmillan to formally join the company at that time. Sara Miller McCune remained president for 18 years, shifting to board chairman in 1984 (and still retains the title of executive chairman). The couple continued to develop the company together until George McCune's death in 1990.

In 2008, SAGE along with two other companies sued Georgia State University for alleged copyright infringement due to faculty providing excerpts of materials to students. The case concluded in 2020 with the publishing companies losing. 

In 2018, SAGE reported a mean 2017 gender pay gap of 13.1% for its UK workforce, while the median was 10.3%.

In 2018, SAGE acquired Lean Library, a browser extension and discovery service, which then faced opposition by part of the academic community for being owned by a for-profit, as opposed to open data, open source and non-profit products like Unpaywall which facilitates usage of open access works.

OASPA membership
SAGE Publishing was a founding member of the Open Access Scholarly Publishers Association (OASPA) when it was established in 2008. In November 2013, OASPA reviewed SAGE's membership after the Journal of International Medical Research accepted a false and intentionally flawed paper created and submitted by a reporter for the journal Science as part of a "sting" to test the effectiveness of the peer-review processes of open access journals . SAGE's membership was reinstated at the end of the six month review period following changes to the journal's editorial processes.

Acquisitions 

SAGE has acquired a number of other companies, including:

Pion Limited, founded in 1959 by Adam Gelbtuch and John Ashby, was the publisher of four journals in the Environment and Planning series. SAGE acquired Pion in May 2015.
Global Village Publishing, which develops software and services for electronic publishing, was acquired by SAGE in May 2018.
Talis, an educational technology company which developed the learning management system Talis Aspire, was acquired by SAGE in August 2018.

Publications 
 

Improving Schools, academic journal that covers education
Journal of Developing Societies, academic journal that covers development

See also 
 Journals published by SAGE

References

External links 
 
 

Publishing companies established in 1965
Academic publishing companies
Book publishing companies based in California
Companies based in Thousand Oaks, California
1965 establishments in New York City
American companies established in 1965